Caloptilia maynei is a moth of the family Gracillariidae. It is known from the Democratic Republic of Congo and Nigeria.

The larvae feed on Pseudospondias microcarpa. They probably mine the leaves of their host plant.

References

maynei
Insects of the Democratic Republic of the Congo
Insects of West Africa
Moths of Africa
Moths described in 1940